HC Vilnius  is a team handball club from Vilnius, Lithuania. Currently club is competing in Lithuanian Handball League.

Accomplishments

LHL:1st
2006

References 

Lithuanian handball clubs
Sport in Vilnius
Lithuanian Handball League clubs